is a district of Nakano, Tokyo, Japan.

As of October 2020, the population of this district is 27,358. The postal code for Nakano is 164-0001.

Geography
Nakano borders Arai, Nogata, and Kamitakada in the north, Higashinakano to the east, Chūō to the south, and Kōenji to the west.

Education
Nakano City Board of Education (中野区教育委員会) operates public elementary and junior high schools.

Public elementary and junior high schools in Nakano:
 Yato Elementary School (谷戸小学校)
 Momozono Daini (No. 2) Elementary School (桃園第二小学校)
 Nakano Higashi (East) Junior High School (中野東中学校)
 Nakano Junior High School (中野中学校)

1-chome is zoned to Yato Elementary. 2-3-chome are zoned to Toka Elementary School (桃花小学校). 4-chome is zoned to Heiwa-no-Mori Elementary School (平和の森小学校). 5-6-chome are zoned to Momozono Daini ES. 2-5 chome are zoned to Nakano JHS while 1 and 6 chome are zoned to Nakano Nigashi JHS.

Gallery

References

Neighborhoods of Tokyo
Nakano, Tokyo